Franz Leitner (born 1968) is a former Austrian motorcycle speedway rider who rode in the 1995 Speedway Grand Prix of Austria. He is the only Austrian who has ridden in Speedway Grand Prix series.

Speedway Grand Prix results

Career details

World Championships 

 Individual World Championship (Speedway Grand Prix)
 1995 - 23rd place (6 points in one event)
 Team World Championships (Speedway World Team Cup and Speedway World Cup)
 1994 - 4th place in Group B

See also 
 Austria national speedway team
 List of Speedway Grand Prix riders

References 

1968 births
Living people
Austrian speedway riders